Charaxes (Polyura) dehanii is a butterfly in the family Nymphalidae. It was described by John Obadiah Westwood in 1850. It is found in the Indomalayan realm in Java (C. d. dehanii) and Sumatra (C. d. sulthan (Hagen, 1896)).

Subspecies
C. d. dehanii (Java)
C. d. sulthan (Hagen, 1896) (Sumatra)

References

External links
Polyura Billberg, 1820 at Markku Savela's Lepidoptera and Some Other Life Forms

Polyura
Butterflies described in 1850